The Canton of Conty  is a former canton situated in the department of the Somme and in the former Picardy region of northern France. It was disbanded following the French canton reorganisation which came into effect in March 2015. It consisted of 23 communes, which joined the canton of Ailly-sur-Noye in 2015. It had 9,237 inhabitants (2012).

Geography 
The canton is organised around the commune of Conty in the arrondissement of Amiens. The altitude varies from 36m at Bacouel-sur-Selle to 194m at Belleuse for an average of 83m.

The canton comprised 23 communes:

Bacouel-sur-Selle
Belleuse
Bosquel
Brassy
Contre
Conty
Courcelles-sous-Thoix
Essertaux
Fleury
Fossemanant
Frémontiers
Lœuilly
Monsures
Namps-Maisnil
Nampty
Neuville-lès-Lœuilly
Oresmaux
Plachy-Buyon
Prouzel
Sentelie
Thoix
Tilloy-lès-Conty
Velennes

Population

See also
 Arrondissements of the Somme department
 Cantons of the Somme department
 Communes of the Somme department

References

Conty
2015 disestablishments in France
States and territories disestablished in 2015